Joseph Carpenter (born 19 August 2001) is an English rugby union player who plays for Premiership Rugby club Sale Sharks. He plays primarily as a fullback.

Early life 
Carpenter was born in Leeds. He attended Lawnswood School before then moving to Woodhouse Grove School. He began playing rugby at the age of five, playing for West Park Leeds RUFC. Carpenter joined the Leeds Carnegie academy at the age of 15.

Club career 
Carpenter signed for Sale Sharks in August 2019. He made his debut for the club off the bench in the European Rugby Champions Cup in January 2020, in a 30-23 loss to La Rochelle. He then made his first start on 18 January in the same competition against Glasgow Warriors.

In March 2021 he joined Nottingham Rugby on dual registration. He started in Nottingham's opening fixture against Ealing Trailfinders. He also featured for Sale in this time period, starting against Wasps in the Premiership Rugby Cup and scoring his first try for the club, on 29 March, in a win against Harlequins - also in the cup. 

In October 2021 Carpenter was dual registered with Sale FC, making his debut against Taunton Titans. 

Carpenter made his Premiership Rugby debut on 1 October 2022, playing at the Salford City Stadium against Exeter Chiefs. He scored his first Premiership try in the fixture, which Sale won 28-20.

Carpenter was voted the Rugby Player's Association 15 under 23 MVP of the month for October 2022, after scoring 3 tries in 5 appearances.

International career 

Carpenter was selected for England U16 in April 2017, playing in a 41-22 win over Wales. He was then named in an England U17 training squad in February 2018, although he did not ultimately feature for the side. 

In April 2019 Carpenter was named as part of England's squad for the U18 Six Nations festival, starting against Wales. He was then named as part of the England U20 elite player squad for 2021, although he did not feature for the side.

References 

2001 births
Living people
Sale Sharks players
English rugby union players
Nottingham R.F.C. players
Rugby union fullbacks
Rugby union players from Leeds
People educated at Lawnswood School
People educated at Woodhouse Grove School